Marisa Chappell is an American historian and associate professor at Oregon State University. She is known for her works on economic history of the United States. Her book The War on Welfare was selected by Choice Magazine as an Outstanding Academic Title for 2010.

Books
 The War on Welfare: Family, Poverty, and Politics in Modern America, University of Pennsylvania Press, 2009
 Welfare in the United States: A History with Documents, Routledge Press, 2009 (co-editor with Premilla Nadasen and Jennifer Mittelstadt)

References

External links
Marisa Chappell at Oregon State University

Living people
21st-century American historians
Oregon State University faculty
Emory University alumni
Northwestern University alumni
Year of birth missing (living people)